Jasubhai Digital Media (JDM) was a part of Jasubhai Group, Mumbai, India. 9.9 Media acquired it in December 2007. It is a publisher of several technology magazines like Digit (magazine), Skoar and CTO Forum. The company has also organized events like CTO Forum, CRN Channel Awards, Circle of Influence, CRN CARE, Channel Summit etc.

The company was also the publisher of Networking Computing India, and CRN - India, in collaboration with CMP Media LLC. USA. However, as of 2006 CMP Media moved out of the partnership and entered the Indian publishing market to market Network Computing and CRN - India on its own.

References 

CMP Technology to publish 'CRN' and 'Network Computing' in India, independently News snippet carried by Indian Media Observer.

External links 
 Jasubhai Digital Media

Companies based in Mumbai
Companies with year of establishment missing
Publishing companies of India